Roc-aux-Sorciers is an Upper Paleolithic rock shelter site dating to the mid-Magdalenian cultural stage, ca 14,000 yBP, made famous by its relief wall carvings. The site is in the French commune of Angles-sur-l'Anglin, in Vienne. The name 'Sorcerers' Rock', with its suggestions of pagan rendez-vous, was applied to the site long before the wall-carvings were discovered.

The two parts are separated by a zone that has not yet been excavated, kept in reserve. The site was classed a Monument Historique, 18 January 1955.

The Site 
The rockshelter is open on the south side, on the right bank of the river Anglin, at the base of the Douce cliffs. It is composed of two distinct geological parts:

 The lower Bourdois rockshelter which is a classic rockshelter with a low roof;
 The upper Taillebourg vault (previously Lucien Jacob vault), deeper and which is a typical vestibule type.

These two parts are actually separated by a non-excavated area, which is being conserved as an archeological reserve. The site is classed as an Historical Monument since the 18th of January 1955. The names of the ancient owners of the parcels, Madame Bourdois and Monsieur Taillebourg, were conserved by Suzanne de Saint-Mathurin as names of the dug sectors. These names are still used.

Excavation history 

The history of discoveries at Roc-aux-Sorciers begins in 1927, when Lucien Rousseau discovered the Paleolithic habitation and identified it as mid-Magdalenian in its culture. He began excavations in the Cave Taillebourg and recovered an engraved stone in which Henri Breuil detected the representation of a mammoth. Some years later, Suzanne de Saint-Mathurin became aware of Rousseau's article and decided to explore further, hoping to find some incised plaquettes like those from the cave at Lussac-les-Châteaux, also in Vienne. Assisted by her friend Dorothy Garrod, she carried out a decade of intensive campaigns between 1947 and 1957, and followed more sporadically until 1964. The team discovered carved blocks with sculpted and incised figures, sometimes painted, of bison, horses, wild goats, felines and the figure of a man. It soon became clear that these fragments had fallen from the roof of the Cave Taillebourg. Only the carved and painted figure of a bison (illustration, right above) has remained in place.

In all it appears that there were two phases of occupation at Roc-aux-Sorciers, the first from the Middle Magdelenian around 15 000BP which was sealed by the collapse of the rockshelter roof, and a second occupation from the Upper Magdelenianaround 12-10 000BP.The sculptures appear to be from the first occupation. As well as the wall art, traces of a domestic style occupation suggesting this was not a sanctuary.

The sculpted frieze was discovered from 1950. It is composed of bison, horses, wild goats, felines, and the headless and footless figures of women, of the type conventionally called Venuses.

The sculpted frieze of the Abri Bourdois

The sculpted frieze is exceptional for the evidence it offers of the technical mastery of Magdalenian sculptors, for the anatomical details and the impression of power given to volumes in the play of firelight. Both animal and human figures strive for realism, a rarity in paleolithic art that reinforces the unique value of the site.

The excavations brought to light the evidence of human occupation associated with this wall art, of a material culture represented in jewelry, lamps, and tools in flint, in bone and horn and in ivory. The frieze, some twenty metres in length, is an impressively monumental work of art. Numerous finely engraved figures show that graphic values could be expressed on an intimate scale as well.

The Rockshelter today 
After her death in 1991 Suzanne de Saint-Mathurin donated the site and her archives to the French state. Genevieve Pinçon continued excavations at the site as part of a multi-disciplinary team including Ludmila Iakovleva, the frieze was published in 1997.

A visitor centre has been built around the site in order to protect the friezes and present them to visitors.

See also
 List of Stone Age art

Notes

Bibliography 
 Auzanne I., Desroches E. and Pinçon G., 2002, "Bilan d’interventions sur le site magdalénien du Roc-aux-Sorciers à Angles-sur-l’Anglin (86, France) : restauration, analyse de la polychromie et relevé numérique 3D",  L’art avant l’Histoire, la conservation de l’art préhistorique, 10e journée d’études de la Section Française de l’Institut International de Conservation (SFIIC), Paris, 23-24 mai 2002, pp. 221–241, ill.
 Auzanne I. and Fuentes O., 2003, "Le 'sorcier' du Roc-aux-Sorciers à Angles-sur-l'Anglin (Vienne, France) : nouveaux éléments d'analyse", Antiquités Nationales, n° 35, pp. 41–54, ill.
 Iakovleva L. and Pinçon G., 1997, "La Frise sculptée du Roc-aux-Sorciers, Angles-sur-l'Anglin (Vienne)", Paris, CTHS/RMN, 168 p., ill.
 Iakovleva L. and Pinçon G., 1999, "L'art pariétal sculpté dans l'habitat du Roc-aux-Sorciers à Angles-sur-l'Anglin (Vienne, France)", L'Anthropologie, 103.4,:549-568 (abstract).
 Rousseau L., 1933, "Le Magdalénien dans la Vienne. Découverte et fouille d'un gisement du Magdalénien à Angles-sur-l'Anglin (Vienne)", Bulletin de la Société Préhistorique Française, n° 30, pp. 239–256, ill.
 Saint-Mathurin S. de, 1970, "À propos d’une pointe en os à base fourchue de l’abri du Roc-aux-Sorciers (Angles-sur-l’Anglin, Vienne)", Antiquités Nationales, n° 2, pp. 14–20, ill.
 Saint-Mathurin S. de, 1975, "Reliefs magdaléniens d'Angles-sur-l'Anglin (Vienne)", Antiquités Nationales, n° 7, pp. 24–31, ill.
 Saint-Mathurin S. de, 1978, "Les 'Vénus' pariétales et mobilières du Magdalénien d’Angles-sur-l’Anglin", Antiquités Nationales, n° 10, pp. 15–22, ill.
 Saint-Mathurin S. de, 1984, "L’abri du Roc-aux-Sorciers," L’Art des Cavernes. Atlas des grottes ornées paléolithiques françaises, (Paris, Ministère de la Culture), pp. 583–587, ill.
 Saint-Mathurin S. de and Garrod D., 1949, "Les fragments de bas-reliefs découverts dans le gisement magdalénien ancien d’Angles-sur-l’Anglin (Vienne)", C.-R. Académie des Inscriptions et Belles-Lettres, séance du 20 mai 1949, pp. 138–142, ill.

External links
 French Ministry of Culture information site; includes an interactive virtual reproduction
 Centre d'interprétation de la frise magdalénienne du Roc-aux-Sorciers (Official website)
 Archives of the Roc-aux-sorciers project (wiki)

Prehistoric sculpture
Prehistoric sites in France
Vienne
Magdalenian